Trepobates inermis is a species of water strider in the family Gerridae. It is found in the eastern United States from Florida to Michigan and Massachusetts, as well as Ontario, Canada.

References

Trepobatinae
Insects described in 1926